Yates is a former unincorporated community in Taylor County, West Virginia. The site is now underwater in Tygart Lake, having been inundated after construction of the Tygart Dam (1934–38).

References 

Unincorporated communities in West Virginia
Unincorporated communities in Taylor County, West Virginia